Juan Viedma may refer to:
 Juan Viedma (footballer) (born 1974), Spanish-Dutch retired footballer
 Juan Viedma (athlete), Paralympic athlete from Spain